Antheraea celebensis is a moth of the family Saturniidae first described by Watson in 1915. It is found in Sulawesi and Sundaland.

External links

Antheraea
Moths of Asia
Moths described in 1915